Bert Scott is a footballer.

Bert Scott may also refer to:

Bert Scott, businessman, co-founder of Hall-Scott

See also
Robert Scott (disambiguation)
Albert Scott (disambiguation)
Hubert Scott, British aircraft and boat designer
Herbert Scott (disambiguation)